Jeremy Chiang Wei Jian (born 11 April 1985) is a Singaporean former professional footballer who played as a right-back for Warriors FC in the S-League. Jeremy is now an entrepreneur.

References

External links
 

1985 births
Living people
Singaporean footballers
Association football fullbacks
Singapore international footballers
Asian Games competitors for Singapore
Footballers at the 2006 Asian Games
Warriors FC players
Young Lions FC players
Home United FC players
Singaporean sportspeople of Chinese descent